Anne Marie François Barbuat de Maison-Rouge de Boisgérard, born 8 July 1767 in Tonnerre, Department Yonne in Burgundy, France, and died in combat on 9 February 1799 in Capua, near Mantua, in Italy, was a French general in the Revolutionary Wars.  He directed the engineering defense of Kehl during the 1796 siege.  He served in the Republican army from 1791 to his death in 1799. 

He was the son of the General of Brigade Jacques François Barbuat de Maison-Rouge de Boisgérard (1739-1815).

1767 births
1799 deaths
People from Tonnerre, Yonne
French generals
French Republican military leaders of the French Revolutionary Wars
Names inscribed under the Arc de Triomphe